Alluaudia comosa is a rare species of flowering plant. It belongs to the family Didiereaceae, subfamily Didiereoideae, which is found only in the coastal area of SW Madagascar. Didierea comosa Drake is a synonym. It is listed as "vulnerable" on the IUCN Red List of Threatened Species.

Description

Alluaudia comosa has a distinctive, easily recognized silhouette with a short trunk and dense branches that stop in a flat crown. This is a deciduous shrub to small tree 2-6 (-10) metres tall that is woody, semi-succulent and spiny, with spines set singly. Spines are grey and 1.5-3.5 cm long. 

Leaves are developed mostly in pairs, set on a short stalk (petiole), dying off at the beginning of the dry season. They are rounded (10–22 mm X 10 mm) and fleshy.

Flowers
Flowers are produced on a reduced inflorescence in Alluaudia comosa; only the end flower develops, and is set on a very short axis. Flowers are dioecious (male and female flowers on separate plants).

Habitat 
This species grows on limestone in dry forests or coastal shrubland.

References

Didiereaceae
Endemic flora of Madagascar
Flora of the Madagascar spiny thickets